JAR Stadium is a football stadium, located in the capital of Uzbekistan, in Tashkent. It is part of the JAR Sport Complex. The stadium seats 8,500 spectators.

JAR Stadium opened in 1998. It was renovated in 2005. At the end of 2008, when the MHSK Stadium was demolished, the Bunyodkor football club temporarily moved to the Jar Stadium, and even after building its new Bunyodkor Stadium (now Milliy Stadium) in 2013, the club held some home matches at this stadium the end of 2015. In 2012, during the renovation of the Pakhtakor Stadium, at this stadium, Pakhtakor played their home games for the floor of the season. In addition, the national, olympic, youth and women teams of Uzbekistan hold some matches at this stadium. From the season of 2016, the stadium has been rented by the club - Obod. Also at the stadium, the women's national football teams of Uzbekistan, different in age, hold their own matches. The JAR Stadium is also one of the bases of the national team of Uzbekistan and the main training stadium for preparations for matches and camps.

References

External links
 Stadium information
 Информация о стадионе и список матчей проведённых на стадионе «Джар» footballfacts.ru
 Стадион «Джар» (вид со спутника) на сайте wildstat.ru

Football venues in Uzbekistan
Buildings and structures in Tashkent
Sport in Tashkent